Platycheirus splendidus is a species of hoverfly. It is found in many parts of Britain and Europe.

References

Diptera of Europe
Syrphinae
Insects described in 1998